Trichodezia albofasciata is a moth in the family Geometridae. It is found in the United States.

References

Moths described in 1863
Cidariini